Institutional ethnography (IE) is an alternative approach of studying and understanding the social. IE has been described as an alternative philosophical paradigm, sociology, or (qualitative) research method. IE explores the social relations that structure people's everyday lives, specifically by looking at the ways that people interact with one another in the context of social institutions (school, marriage, work, for example) and understanding how those interactions are institutionalized. IE is best understood as an ethnography of interactions which have been institutionalized, rather than an ethnography of specific companies, organizations or employment sectors, which would be considered industrial sociology or the sociology of work. For the institutional ethnographer, ordinary daily activity becomes the site for an investigation of social organization. 
IE was first developed by Dorothy E. Smith as a Marxist feminist sociology "for women, for people"; and is now used by researchers in social sciences, education, nursing, human services and policy research as a method for mapping the translocal relations that coordinate people's activities within institutions.

Further reading 
 Campbell, Marie L. (2004) Mapping Social Relations: An introduction to Institutional Ethnography Altamira Press.
 Comber, B. (2012). Mandated literacy assessment and the reorganisation of teachers’ work: federal policy, local effects. Critical Studies in Education, 53(2), 119–136.
 Corman, M. K. (2017). Paramedics On and Off the Streets: Emergency Medical Services in the Age of Technological Governance. Toronto: University of Toronto Press. 
 Hart, R. J., & McKinnon, A. (2010). Sociological epistemology: Durkheim's Paradox and Dorothy E. Smith's Actuality. Sociology, 44(6), 1038–1054. 
 Kearney, G. P., Corman, M. K., Hart, N. D., Johnston, J. L., & Gormley, G. J. (2019). Why institutional ethnography? Why now? Institutional ethnography in health professions education. Perspectives on Medical Education, 8(1), 17–24. https://doi.org/10.1007/s40037-019-0499-0
Melon, K. A., White, D., & Rankin, J. (2013). Beat the clock! Wait times and the production of “quality” in emergency departments. Nursing Philosophy, 14(3), 223–237. https://doi.org/10.1111/nup.12022
Ng, Roxana (1996). The Politics of Community Services. Fernwood Press.
Rankin, J. (2017). Conducting Analysis in Institutional Ethnography: Analytical Work Prior to Commencing Data Collection. International Journal of Qualitative Methods, 16(1), 1–9. https://doi.org/10.1177/1609406917734484
 Smith, D. E. (2005) Institutional Ethnography: A Sociology for People Lanham: Alta-Mira Press
 Smith, D. E. (editor) (2006). Institutional ethnography as practice Rowman and Littlefield
 LaFrance, M. (2019). Institutional Ethnography: A Theory of Practice for Writing Studies Researchers. Logan: Utah State University Press.

See also 
 Dorothy E. Smith
 Roxana Ng

External links 
 What is institutional ethnography? 
 Institutional Ethnography – Towards a Productive Sociology.  An Interview with Dorothy E. Smith by Karin Widerberg (MS Word document)
The Praxis Safety and Accountability Audit:  Practicing a "Sociology for the People" by Jane Sadusky, Rhonda Martinson, Kristine Lizdas and Casey McGee
 Institutional ethnography in Wikiversity http://en.wikiversity.org/wiki/Institutional_ethnography

Ethnography